Christian Baude (born 6 October 1982) is a German luger who has competed since 2002. He finished ninth in the men's doubles event at the 2008 FIL European Luge Championships in Cesana, Italy.

Baude also finished 12th in the men's doubles event at the 2005 FIL World Luge Championships in Park City, Utah in the United States.

References

External links
 

1982 births
Living people
People from Suhl
People from Bezirk Suhl
German male lugers
German male skeleton racers
Sportspeople from Thuringia
21st-century German people